The 2021 World Bridge Team Championships (45th) was a contract bridge event being held in Salsomaggiore Terme, Italy, from 27 March to 9 April 2022, delayed from its original schedule due to the COVID-19 pandemic.

During the event, the 45th Bermuda Bowl, the 23rd Venice Cup, the 11th d'Orsi Trophy and the 2nd Wuhan Cup were contested. The NBO Trophy was cancelled after Round 6 because too many teams withdrew, compromising the technical integrity of the tournament.

Teams representing France and Poland were the most successful medalists, each capturing one gold and one bronze. The only other nation to capture more than one medal was the United States, with one silver and one bronze.

Medalists

Medals

Swiss Teams
Play of the NBO Trophy is suspended after Round 6.

Rankings (Round 6)

Rank 	Team 	VPs

1 	USA 1 Women 	83.07

2 	ISRAEL Mixed 	81.13

3 	SOUTH AFRICA 	73.65

4 	NEW ZEALAND BB 	73.44

Bermuda Bowl

Round robin

Final round

Venice Cup

Round robin

Final round

d'Orsi Trophy

Round robin

Final round

Wuhan Cup

Round robin

Final round

References

External links 
 Official website
 Results
 Bulletins

Contract bridge world competitions
World Bridge Team Championships
International sports competitions hosted by Italy
World Bridge Team Championships
World Bridge Team Championships